Indothais wutingi is a species of sea snail, a marine gastropod mollusk, in the family Muricidae, the murex snails or rock snails.

Distribution
This marine species occurs off Australia.

References

wutingi
Gastropods described in 1997